Yamanoue Sōji (山上宗二 ; 1544–90) was a Japanese tea master. 

Originally a merchant from Sakai, he became a famous disciple of Sen no Rikyū and wrote the chronicle Yamanoue Sōji ki (山上宗二記), which gives commentary about Rikyū's teachings and the state of chanoyu at the time of its writing. In it he also elaborates on the principle of ichi-go ichi-e (一期一会 "one time, one meeting"). 

He later entered into the service of the Later Hōjō lords of Odawara. The clan however fell from power after their opposition to lord Toyotomi Hideyoshi in the Siege of Odawara (1590). Yamanoue Sōji was sentenced by Toyotomi Hideyoshi to have his ears and nose cut off and was then decapitated. One year later his master was also sentenced to death and had to commit ritual suicide.

In popular culture 
He was portrayed in the 1989 movies Rikyu by Hisashi Igawa, and in Death of a Tea Master. 

Hyouge Mono (へうげもの Hepburn: Hyōge Mono, lit. "Jocular Fellow") is a Japanese manga written and illustrated by Yoshihiro Yamada. It was adapted into an anime series in 2011, and includes a fictionalized depiction of Yamanoue Sōji's life and execution.

References 

1544 births
1590 deaths
Japanese merchants
Japanese tea masters
People of Azuchi–Momoyama-period Japan
People of Sengoku-period Japan
16th-century Japanese businesspeople